Hinkson Creek is a stream in Boone County in the U.S. state of Missouri. Its middle section runs through the city of Columbia, Missouri It was named after Robert Hinkson, a pioneer citizen who lived along its banks. Several trails, conservation areas, and parks are along its path. it eventually empties into Perche Creek southwest of Columbia. The MKT Trail follows the creek in Boone County.

The stream headwaters arise at  approximately two miles northeast of Hallsville at an approximate elevation of 880 feet. The stream flows south-southwest past Hallsville and through the east side of Columbia where it passes under US Route 63 and I-70.

The Hinkson Woods Conservation Area is located within meanders of the creek. On June 25, 2021 the Hinkson flooded, reaching a record 23.04 feet in Columbia.

Gallery

See also
List of rivers of Missouri

References

External links
USGS current conditions

Geography of Columbia, Missouri
Rivers of Boone County, Missouri
Rivers of Missouri